Grand Theft Auto is a 1977 American road action comedy film starring and directed by Ron Howard in his first feature film directorial debut, who also wrote the screenplay with his real life father Rance Howard, who also co-starred in the film. As of 2022, this is the only film that Howard has both directed and starred in. The film takes its title from the crime grand theft auto, which is committed a number of times by several different characters.

Plot 
In Los Angeles, Paula Powers' (Nancy Morgan) wealthy parents, Bigby (Barry Cahill) and Priscilla Powers (Elizabeth Rogers), want her to marry Collins Hedgeworth (Paul Linke), whom they refer to as her fiance, and also hails from a wealthy family. Paula is really in love with classmate Sam Freeman (Ron Howard), an environmental research major, however, her father dismisses him as a "fortune hunter", which they dispute. Bigby yells at Sam to leave, and while he tries to defend himself, Paula tells him to go wait for her outside. Bigby tells Paula that he is running for governor and wants her to cooperate. However, Paula dismisses Collins as a "flake", and tells her parents that she won't marry him and will elope with Sam to Las Vegas. Bigby threatens to disinherit her and take away her sports car (that she had bought with her own money) if she disobeys him.

Paula goes to her room and escapes through the window, stealing her parents' Rolls-Royce Silver Cloud and hitting the road with Sam, beginning a wild explosive car chase and race towards Las Vegas. Bigby calls his associate Ned Slinker (played by Ron Howard's real-life father Rance), asking him to bring back Paula and the Rolls-Royce, and to have Sam incarcerated, without involvement of police and news media. Priscilla gets a call from Collins, who is currently in a stable playing polo, and tells him Paula ran off. Enraged, Collins smashes the phone and takes off in his car. After crashing it, he steals another car from a nearby dealership to continue the chase. His mother Vivian (Marion Ross, Ron Howard's co-star on Happy Days), after being informed of it by the police, decides to go after him herself before the police could arrest him.

Collins catches up with Paula and Sam on the Interstate, but ends up crashing the car he stole. Before stealing another car, he calls the TenQ radio station to DJ Curly Q. Brown (Don Steele), offering $25,000 to whoever can catch her. Several people, hearing it on the radio, including two mechanics Ace (Ron Howard's younger brother, Clint Howard) and Sparky (Pete Isacksen) in an antique Bugatti Type 35, set off after Paula and Sam. Vivian also calls TenQ, offering $25,000 for the safe return of her son. As she runs a red light, she attracts the attention of Officer Norman Tad (James Ritz), who chases after her. She ends up crashing into a tree and the officer attempts to arrest her, and her blurting out trying to save her son is overheard by a nearby preacher (Hoke Howell), who steals the police car to collect the reward money. Vivian also continues the chase, prompting the officer to commandeer a bus.

After hearing a radio listener call-in saying Sam ought to be shot, Paula calls the station from the car phone and tells her side of the story. Upon hearing it, Curly announces that he will root for them. As Ace and Sparky catch up to them, they turn off the Interstate in an attempt to lose their pursuers in the desert. Sam wants to head to Reno to marry instead, but Paula is set on a Vegas wedding. Bigby calls Paula on the car phone, trying to get her to come back. When Paula tells him that her dream is to marry Sam, he calls it a "damn lousy dream". Curly goes up in a helicopter to follow Paula and Sam, annoying them as he is now sharing their location and attracting more people to collect the reward. When Collins crashes his stolen car, the preacher attempts to catch him and collect his money, but Collins convinces him to chase after Paula with him to double the reward. Tad manages to arrest Vivian and drags her onto the bus with him, as they continue the chase after Paula and Sam.

As Paula and Sam cross the Nevada state line, Slinker hires a local Vegas mob to try and stop them. As they approach Las Vegas, Sam starts to have doubts about Paula wanting to elope, thinking she just wants to spite her father. They pull over and have a small argument in an abandoned junkyard, and when Sam asks Paula if she really want to go through with the marriage and she convinces him she does, they embrace and continue on.

The pursuing cars all end up in a demolition derby (filmed at the Victorville fairgrounds). The priceless Rolls-Royce is destroyed, with Paula and Sam bailing out at the last moment, causing a massive pile-up. The derby announcer tells everyone who they are, causing the crowd to cheer them on. Bigby and Slinker chase after Paula and Sam, who are on foot, in a van, but derby cars crash into them. Paula and Sam make it to the grandstand, and the crowd, cheering them on, lets them through. As Bigby, Slinker, Collins and the preacher reach the bleachers, the crowd boos them and pelts them with food, allowing Paula and Sam to get into a taxi outside and slip away, as the police arrives at the fairgrounds and arrests the pursuers. When Vivian reaches her son, she tells him not to fret about Paula, calling her "socially inferior" right next to the Bigby, who attempts to defend his daughter's honor, to which she calls him an "uncouth ass". When Bigby insults her back, Collins attempts to charge at him, but he punches him out, saying he's glad Paula didn't marry him, calling him a "flake" like Paula did earlier, and concedes that perhaps Paula did marry the right man. (A later chase scene was filmed at the intersection of Highway 18 and Apple Valley Road in Apple Valley.)

At the chapel, Paula and Sam are married, and the minister asks for their autographs. As they exit the chapel, they are surrounded by a swarm of fans, including a hotel owner offering them a free stay in his hotel's honeymoon suite, alongside a ride to the hotel in a limousine. As they go to the hotel, Curly pursues them in a station wagon to get them to do an interview, but misses an oncoming firetruck and ends up crashing through a house into a swimming pool. Paula and Sam kiss in the backseat of the limousine as they ride to the hotel.

Cast

Production 
When Roger Corman was testing titles for Eat My Dust, Grand Theft Auto came a close second as a possible title. So when making a follow up he decided to call it Grand Theft Auto.

The film was made on a budget of $602,000. It was filmed in and around Victorville, California. Roger Corman worked as an executive producer, along with Rance Howard, who also co-wrote the script with Ron.

Reception 
The film was a commercial success, earning over $15 million at the box office, but critical reception was negative. It holds a rating of 29% on Rotten Tomatoes based on 14 reviews.

Home media
The film was released on Region One DVD in 1999 and re-released in 2006 and 2008.

References

External links 
 
 
 
 

1977 films
1970s action comedy films
1970s chase films
1970s comedy road movies
1977 romantic comedy films
American action comedy films
American comedy road movies
American romantic comedy films
1970s English-language films
Films about automobiles
Films directed by Ron Howard
New World Pictures films
Films produced by Roger Corman
1977 directorial debut films
Films shot in California
1970s American films